The Following is an American psychological thriller television series created by Kevin Williamson for the Fox network. Kevin Bacon stars as former FBI agent Ryan Hardy, who is brought out of retirement when infamous serial killer Joe Carroll (James Purefoy), whom Hardy had previously captured, escapes from custody. Hardy soon discovers that the charismatic Carroll has surrounded himself with a group of like-minded individuals whom he met while teaching and while in prison, and turned them into a cult of fanatical killers. When Carroll's son Joey (Kyle Catlett) is abducted by his father's followers, the FBI discovers that it is the first step in a wider plan for Carroll to escape custody, humiliate and eventually kill Hardy, and reunite Carroll with his ex-wife Claire (Natalie Zea).

The series' first season premiered on January 21, 2013. On March 7, 2014, Fox renewed The Following for a third season which premiered in 2015. On May 8, 2015, Fox canceled the series.

Series overview

Episodes

Season 1 (2013)

Season 2 (2014)

Season 3 (2015)

Specials

References

External links 
 
 

The Following
Following, The